Pitcairnia carinata is a plant species in the genus Pitcairnia. This species is endemic to Brazil.

References

carinata
Endemic flora of Brazil
Flora of the Atlantic Forest